Jacqueline Todten (born 29 May 1954 in Berlin) is an East German athlete who competed mainly in the Javelin, who competed for the SC Dynamo Berlin / Sportvereinigung (SV) Dynamo.

She competed for East Germany in the 1972 Summer Olympics held in Munich, Germany in the Javelin where she won the Silver medal finishing behind teammate Ruth Fuchs.

References 

1954 births
Living people
East German female javelin throwers
Olympic silver medalists for East Germany
Medalists at the 1972 Summer Olympics
Athletes (track and field) at the 1972 Summer Olympics
Athletes (track and field) at the 1976 Summer Olympics
Olympic athletes of East Germany
European Athletics Championships medalists
Olympic silver medalists in athletics (track and field)